This is a list of amphibians and reptiles found in Guadeloupe, in the Caribbean. The main islands of Guadeloupe are Basse-Terre, Grande-Terre), Îles des Saintes, La Désirade, and Marie-Galante.

Amphibians
There are six species of amphibian in Guadeloupe, three of which were introduced.  Two species of frog, Eleutherodactylus barlagnei and Eleutherodactylus pinchoni, are endemic to Guadeloupe.

Frogs (Anura)

Reptiles
Including marine turtles and introduced species, there are 21 reptile species reported in Guadeloupe.  Four species are endemic.

Turtles (Testudines)

Lizards and snakes (Squamata)

Disputed or unconfirmed species

Species by island

Amphibians

Reptiles

Notes

References 
Note: All species listed above are supported by Malhotra & Thorpe 1999, unless otherwise cited.

.
.

 List
Guadeloupe
Guadeloupe
 Guadeloupe
Guadeloupe